

The Columbian Centinel (1790–1840) was a  Boston, Massachusetts, newspaper established by Benjamin Russell. It continued its predecessor, the Massachusetts Centinel and the Republican Journal, which Russell and partner William Warden had first issued on March 24, 1784. The paper was "the most influential and enterprising paper in Massachusetts after the Revolution."  In the Federalist Era it was aligned with Federalist sentiment. Until c. 1800 its circulation was the largest in Boston, and its closest competitor was the anti-Federalist Independent Chronicle ("the compliments that were frequently exchanged by these journalistic adversaries were more forcible than polite").

Russell "can be justly characterized as the Horace Greeley of his time." In 1828 Russell sold the Centinel to Joseph T. Adams and Thomas Hudson, who continued publishing it. In 1840, the Centinel merged with a number of other Boston papers—the Independent Chronicle & Boston Patriot, the Boston Commercial Gazette, and the New-England Palladium—to form the Boston Semi-weekly Advertiser, which eventually became the Boston Herald.

Titles
The Massachusetts Centinel: and the Republican Journal. Mar. 24 – Oct. 13, 1784.
The Massachusetts Centinel. Oct. 16, 1784 – June 12, 1790.
Columbian Centinel. June 16, 1790 – Oct. 2, 1799.
Columbian Centinel & Massachusetts Federalist. Oct. 5, 1799 – July 2, 1800.
Columbian Centinel. Massachusetts Federalist. July 5 – Dec. 31, 1800.
Columbian Centinel. Sept. 5, 1804 – May 23, 1840.

References

Further reading
 A free, uninfluenced news-paper. Printing-office, Marlborough-Street, Boston, March 11, 1784. To the publick. ... Proposals for publishing, every Wednesday and Saturday, a free, uninfluenced news-paper, to be entitled, the Massachusetts centinel... [Boston : Printed by Warden and Russell, 1784].
 Justin Winsor. Memorial History of Boston, vol.3. Boston: Ticknor & Co., 1881. p. 617+ (includes portrait of Benjamin Russell on p. 619).

External links
 Library of Congress. Massachusetts Centinel. Boston: Published by Warden & Russell, 1785.
 Villanova University.  Digital Library:  Selected Issues Columbian Centinel. 

Newspapers published in Boston
Publications established in 1790
Defunct newspapers published in Massachusetts
Defunct companies based in Massachusetts
19th century in Boston